A polymeric foam is a special foam, in liquid or solidified form, formed from polymers.

Examples include:
 Ethylene-vinyl acetate (EVA) foam, the copolymers of ethylene and vinyl acetate; also referred to as polyethylene-vinyl acetate (PEVA)
 Low-density polyethylene (LDPE) foam, first grade of polyethylene (PE)
 Nitrile rubber (NBR) foam, the copolymers of acrylonitrile (ACN) and butadiene
 Polychloroprene foam or Neoprene
 Polyimide foam
 Polypropylene (PP) foam, including expanded polypropylene (EPP) and polypropylene paper (PPP)
 Polystyrene (PS) foam, including expanded polystyrene (EPS), extruded polystyrene foam (XPS) and sometimes polystyrene paper (PSP)
 Styrofoam, including extruded polystyrene foam (XPS) and sometimes expanded polystyrene (EPS)
 Polyurethane (PU) foam
 LRPu low-resilience polyurethane
 Memory foam
 Sorbothane
Polyethylene foam, as used in PEF rod
 Polyvinyl chloride (PVC) foam
 Closed-cell PVC foamboard
 Silicone foam
 Microcellular foam

See also 
Ultralight material

Foams
Polymer chemistry